Galtamycin B is a chemical compound that has been isolated from Micromonospora.

References

Aromatic compounds
Micromonosporaceae
Oxygen heterocycles